David A. Caprio (born June 5, 1967) is an American businessman, investor, lawyer, and politician who served as a member of the Rhode Island House of Representatives from District 34. He was first elected on December 21, 1999. In 2010, Caprio was defeated in a September primary election.

Early life and education 
Caprio is the son of Joyce and the Chief of the Providence Municipal Court Judge Frank Caprio and the brother of former Rhode Island State Treasurer Frank T. Caprio. His paternal grandfather immigrated from Naples, Italy. Caprio attended Bishop Hendricken High School, graduating in 1985. He then went on to Boston College, graduating with a Bachelor of Science in 1989. He earned a Juris Doctor from the Suffolk University Law School and holds a Master of Business Administration degree from the International University of Monaco.

Career 
Caprio works as an attorney for the Providence law firm Caprio and Caprio and is an active real estate investor with holdings in Florida, Narragansett, Newport, Providence, and Barrington, Rhode Island.

Caprio was a former member of the Rhode Island House of Representatives.

Caprio ran a "green campaign", purchasing carbon offsets for his mobile campaign headquarters, printing all campaign materials on recycled paper, and purchasing offsets for his personal residence. He was endorsed by the Sierra Club, the SEIU (Service Employees International Union), and the American Federation of Teachers (AFT). On September 9, 2008, Caprio defeated his primary opponent Ryan P. Drugan by a 42% margin (71%-29%). He had no general election opponent, so he returned to the State House for his fifth term beginning 6 January 2009.

Caprio was named to the House Finance Committee in the 2009 General Assembly Session.

References

External links

Living people
1967 births
American investors
American people of Italian descent
American real estate businesspeople
Boston College alumni
Businesspeople from Rhode Island
Democratic Party members of the Rhode Island House of Representatives
People from Narragansett, Rhode Island
Rhode Island lawyers
Suffolk University Law School alumni